End of the Earth
 Global catastrophe scenarios
 "End of the Earth", a song by Client Liaison from the 2016 album Diplomatic Immunity
 "End of the Earth", a song by Marina from album the 2019 album Love + Fear

See also
 Ends of the Earth (disambiguation)
 To the Ends of the Earth (disambiguation)
 End of the World (disambiguation)